Shohrux Gadoyev is an Uzbekistani footballer who plays as a midfielder for AGMK.

Career
On 26 July 2017, Gadoyev re-signed for FC Bunyodkor.
On 11 December 2019, Gadoyev signed an 18-month contract with Keşla FK of the Azerbaijan Premier League.

Career statistics

Club

International

Statistics accurate as of match played 11 June 2013

International goals
Scores and results list Uzbekistan's goal tally first.

References

External links

Living people
1991 births
Uzbekistani footballers
Uzbekistani expatriate footballers
Uzbekistan international footballers
FC Nasaf players
Al-Muharraq SC players
FC Bunyodkor players
Buxoro FK players
Daejeon Hana Citizen FC players
Uzbekistan Super League players
K League 2 players
Bahraini Premier League players
People from Qashqadaryo Region
Association football midfielders
Uzbekistani expatriate sportspeople in South Korea
Uzbekistani expatriate sportspeople in Bahrain
Expatriate footballers in South Korea
Expatriate footballers in Bahrain
Uzbekistani expatriate sportspeople in Azerbaijan
Azerbaijan Premier League players
Expatriate footballers in Azerbaijan